Railroad strike may refer to:
Great Railroad Strike of 1877
Great Railroad Strike of 1922
Great Southwest Railroad Strike of 1886
South Korean railroad strike of 2006

 See also
:Category:Rail transport strikes